Alfred Ames may refer to:

 Alfred Elisha Ames (1814–1874), American physician and politician
 Alfred K. Ames (1866–1950), American politician, businessman and filmmaker